The Maqueta del Centro de Puebla is a copper maquette depicting the city of Puebla's historic centre, in Puebla, Mexico. The sculpture was installed near the Zócalo in 2008.

References

2008 establishments in Mexico
2008 sculptures
Copper sculptures
Outdoor sculptures in Puebla (city)
Historic centre of Puebla